The Woodcock–Hatch–Maxcy House Historic District, also known as the Woodcock Garrison House, is located in North Attleborough, Massachusetts.  Now a museum operated by the North Attleborough Historic Society, the oldest portion of this -story wood-frame house was thought to have been built c. 1670 by John Woodcock, but his house was demolished in 1806, and this house was probably built between 1711 and 1722 by John Daggett.  It was operated as a tavern by Daggett, John Maxcy (1722-1789), and Israel Hatch and his descendants (until the late 19th century).

The property was listed on the National Register of Historic Places in 1990.

See also
National Register of Historic Places listings in Bristol County, Massachusetts

References

Houses in Bristol County, Massachusetts
Houses on the National Register of Historic Places in Bristol County, Massachusetts
Historic districts in Bristol County, Massachusetts
Museums in Bristol County, Massachusetts
Historic districts on the National Register of Historic Places in Massachusetts